Catalan (autonym:), known in the Valencian Community and Carche as Valencian, is a Western Romance language. It is the official language of Andorra, and an official language of three autonomous communities in eastern Spain: Catalonia, the Valencian Community, and the Balearic Islands. It also has semi-official status in the Italian comune of Alghero. It is also spoken in the Pyrénées-Orientales department of France and in two further areas in eastern Spain: the eastern strip of Aragon and the Carche area in the Region of Murcia.

The language evolved from Vulgar Latin in the Middle Ages around the eastern Pyrenees. Nineteenth-century Spain saw a Catalan literary revival, culminating in the early 1900s.

Etymology and pronunciation

The word Catalan is derived from the territorial name of Catalonia, itself of disputed etymology. The main theory suggests that  (Latin Gathia Launia) derives from the name Gothia or Gauthia ("Land of the Goths"), since the origins of the Catalan counts, lords and people were found in the March of Gothia, whence Gothland > Gothlandia > Gothalania > Catalonia theoretically derived.

In English, the term referring to a person first appears in the mid 14th century as Catelaner, followed in the 15th century as Catellain (from French). It is attested a language name since at least 1652.

In the Valencian Community and Carche, the term   is frequently used instead. Thus, the name "Valencian", although often employed for referring to the varieties specific to the Valencian Community and Carche, is also used by Valencians as a name for the language as a whole, synonymous with "Catalan". Both uses of the term have their respective entries in the dictionaries by the Acadèmia Valenciana de la Llengua and the Institut d'Estudis Catalans. See also status of Valencian below.

History

Middle Ages

By the 9th century, Catalan had evolved from Vulgar Latin on both sides of the eastern end of the Pyrenees, as well as the territories of the Roman province of Hispania Tarraconensis to the south. From the 8th century onwards the Catalan counts extended their territory southwards and westwards at the expense of the Muslims, bringing their language with them. This process was given definitive impetus with the separation of the County of Barcelona from the Carolingian Empire in 988.

In the 11th century, documents written in macaronic Latin begin to show Catalan elements, with texts written almost completely in Romance appearing by 1080. Old Catalan shared many features with Gallo-Romance, diverging from Old Occitan between the 11th and 14th centuries.

During the 11th and 12th centuries the Catalan rulers expanded southward to the Ebro river, and in the 13th century they conquered the Land of Valencia and the Balearic Islands. The city of Alghero in Sardinia was repopulated with Catalan speakers in the 14th century. The language also reached Murcia, which became Spanish-speaking in the 15th century.

In the Low Middle Ages, Catalan went through a golden age, reaching a peak of maturity and cultural richness. Examples include the work of Majorcan polymath Ramon Llull (1232–1315), the Four Great Chronicles (13th–14th centuries), and the Valencian school of poetry culminating in Ausiàs March (1397–1459). By the 15th century, the city of Valencia had become the sociocultural center of the Crown of Aragon, and Catalan was present all over the Mediterranean world. During this period, the Royal Chancery propagated a highly standardized language. Catalan was widely used as an official language in Sicily until the 15th century, and in Sardinia until the 17th. During this period, the language was what Costa Carreras terms "one of the 'great languages' of medieval Europe".

Martorell's outstanding novel of chivalry Tirant lo Blanc (1490) shows a transition from Medieval to Renaissance values, something that can also be seen in Metge's work. The first book produced with movable type in the Iberian Peninsula was printed in Catalan.

Start of the modern era

Spain 
With the union of the crowns of Castille and Aragon in 1479, the Spanish kings ruled over different kingdoms, each with its own cultural, linguistic and political particularities, and they had to swear by the Laws of each territory before the respective Parliaments. But after the War of the Spanish Succession, Spain became an Absolute monarchy under Philip V, which led to the assimilation of the Crown of Aragon by the Crown of Castile through the Nueva Planta decrees, as a first step in the creation of the Spanish nation-state; as in other contemporary European states, this meant the imposition of the political and cultural characteristics of the dominant groups. Since the political unification of 1714, Spanish assimilation policies towards national minorities have been a constant.

The process of assimilation began with secret instructions to the corregidores of the Catalan territory: they "will take the utmost care to introduce the Castilian language, for which purpose he will give the most temperate and disguised measures so that the effect is achieved, without the care being noticed." From there, actions in the service of assimilation, discreet or aggressive, were continued, and reached to the last detail, such as, in 1799, the Royal Certificate forbidding anyone to "represent, sing and dance pieces that were not in Spanish." Anyway, the use of Spanish gradually became more prestigious and marked the start of the decline of Catalan. Starting in the 16th century, Catalan literature came under the influence of Spanish, and the nobles, part of the urban and literary classes became bilingual.

France 
With the Treaty of the Pyrenees (1659), Spain ceded the northern part of Catalonia to France, and soon thereafter the local Catalan varieties came under the influence of French, which in 1700 became the sole official language of the region.

Shortly after the French Revolution (1789), the French First Republic prohibited official use of, and enacted discriminating policies against, the regional languages of France, such as Catalan, Alsatian, Breton, Occitan, Flemish, and Basque.

France: 19th to 20th century

Following the French establishment of the colony of Algeria from 1830 onward, it received several waves of Catalan-speaking settlers. People from the Spanish Alicante province settled around Oran, whereas Algiers received immigration from Northern Catalonia and Menorca.

Their speech was known as patuet. By 1911, the number of Catalan speakers was around 100,000. After the declaration of independence of Algeria in 1962, almost all the Catalan speakers fled to Northern Catalonia (as Pieds-Noirs) or Alacant.

The government of France formally recognizes only French as an official language. Nevertheless, on 10 December 2007, the General Council of the Pyrénées-Orientales officially recognized Catalan as one of the languages of the department and seeks to further promote it in public life and education.

Spain: 18th to 20th century

In 1807, the Statistics Office of the French Ministry of the Interior asked the prefects for an official survey on the limits of the French language. The survey found that in Roussillon, almost only Catalan was spoken, and since Napoleon wanted to incorporate Catalonia into France, as happened in 1812, the consul in Barcelona was also asked. He declared that Catalan "is taught in schools, it is printed and spoken, not only among the lower class, but also among people of first quality, also in social gatherings, as in visits and congresses", indicating that it was spoken everywhere "with the exception of the royal courts". He also indicated that Catalan was spoken "in the Kingdom of Valencia, in the islands of Mallorca, Menorca, Ibiza, Sardinia, Corsica and much of Sicily, in the Vall d "Aran and Cerdaña".

The defeat of the pro-Habsburg coalition in the War of Spanish Succession (1714) initiated a series of laws which, among other centralizing measures, imposed the use of Spanish in legal documentation all over Spain. Because of this, use of the Catalan language declined into the 18th century.

However, the 19th century saw a Catalan literary revival, which has continued up to the present day. This period starts with Aribau's Ode to the Homeland (1833); followed in the second half of the 19th century, and the early 20th by the work of Verdaguer (poetry), Oller (realist novel), and Guimerà (drama). In the 19th century, the region of Carche, in the province of Murcia was repopulated with Valencian speakers. Catalan spelling was standardized in 1913 and the language became official during the Second Spanish Republic (1931–1939). The Second Spanish Republic saw a brief period of tolerance, with most restrictions against Catalan lifted.

The Catalan language and culture were frowned upon during the Spanish Civil War (1936–1939) and the subsequent decades in Francoist Catalonia. The Francoist dictatorship (1939–1975) imposed the use of Spanish in schools and in public administration in all of Spain. However, in 1944, it became mandatory by law for universities with Romance Philology to include the subject of Catalan Philology.  Numerous and prestigious cultural contests were created to reward works produced in Catalan. In January 1944, the "Eugenio Nadal" award was created. In 1945, with the sponsorship and subsidy of the Government, the centenary of Mossèn Cinto Verdaguer was celebrated. In 1947 the Joan Martorell prize for novels in Catalan was awarded. In 1949, the Víctor Català award for short novels in Catalan and the Aedos awards for biographies, the Josep Ysart award for essays, and the Ossa Menor award, later renamed Carles Riba, were created. In 1951, a national prize was awarded to poetry in Catalan with the same financial amount as Spanish poetry. That same year, Selecta Editions was founded for works written in Catalan. And the Joanot Martorell is awarded to Josep Pla for his work El carrer estret. In subsequent years (50s, 60s and 70s) countless awards were born, such as the Lletra d'Or, Amadeu Oller for poetry, the Sant Jordi for novels (endowed with 150,000 pesetas), the Honor Award of Catalan Letters, the Verdaguer, the Josep Pla Prize, the Mercè Rodoreda Prize for short stories and narratives. The first Catalan-language TV show was broadcast during the Franco period, in 1964. The Francoist dictatorship (1939–1975) banned the use of Catalan in schools and in public administration. At the same time, oppression of the Catalan language and identity was carried out in schools, through governmental bodies, and in religious centers. Franco's desire for a homogenous Spanish population resonated with some Catalans in favor of his regime, primarily members of the upper class, who began to reject the use of Catalan. Despite all of these hardships, Catalan continued to be used privately within households, and it was able to survive Francisco Franco's dictatorship. Several prominent Catalan authors resisted the suppression through literature.

In addition to the loss of prestige for Catalan and its prohibition in schools, migration during the 1950s into Catalonia from other parts of Spain also contributed to the diminished use of the language. These migrants were often unaware of the existence of Catalan, and thus felt no need to learn or use it. Catalonia was the economic powerhouse of Spain, so these migrations continued to occur from all corners of the country. Employment opportunities were reduced for those who were not bilingual.

Present day
Since the Spanish transition to democracy (1975–1982), Catalan has been institutionalized as an official language, language of education, and language of mass media; all of which have contributed to its increased prestige. In Catalonia, there is an unparalleled large bilingual European non-state linguistic community. The teaching of Catalan is mandatory in all schools, but it is possible to use Spanish for studying in the public education system of Catalonia in two situations – if the teacher assigned to a class chooses to use Spanish, or during the learning process of one or more recently arrived immigrant students. There is also some intergenerational shift towards Catalan.

More recently, several Spanish political forces have tried to increase the use of Spanish in the Catalan educational system. As a result, in May 2022 the Spanish Supreme Court urged the Catalan regional government to enforce a measure by which 25% of all lessons must be taught in Spanish.

According to the Statistical Institute of Catalonia, in 2013 the Catalan language is the second most commonly used in Catalonia, after Spanish, as a native or self-defining language: 7% of the population self-identifies with both Catalan and Spanish equally, 36.4% with Catalan and 47.5% only Spanish. In 2003 the same studies concluded no language preference for self-identification within the population above 15 years old: 5% self-identified with both languages, 44.3% with Catalan and 47.5% with Spanish.

In Andorra, Catalan has always been the sole official language. Since the promulgation of the 1993 constitution, several policies favoring Catalan have been enforced, like Catalan medium education.

On the other hand, there are several language shift processes currently taking place. In the Northern Catalonia area of France, Catalan has followed the same trend as the other minority languages of France, with most of its native speakers being 60 or older (as of 2004). Catalan is studied as a foreign language by 30% of the primary education students, and by 15% of the secondary. The cultural association  promotes a network of community-run schools engaged in Catalan language immersion programs.

In Alicante province, Catalan is being replaced by Spanish and in Alghero by Italian. There is also well ingrained diglossia in the Valencian Community, Ibiza, and to a lesser extent, in the rest of the Balearic islands.

During the 20th century many Catalans emigrated or went into exile to Venezuela, Mexico, Cuba, Argentina and other South American countries. They formed a large number of Catalan colonies that today continue to maintain the Catalan language. They also founded many Catalan casals (associations).

Classification and relationship with other Romance languages

One classification of Catalan is given by Pèire Bèc:
 Romance languages
 Italo-Western languages
 Western Romance languages
 Gallo-Iberian languages
 Gallo-Romance languages
 Occitano-Romance languages
 Catalan language

However, the ascription of Catalan to the Occitano-Romance branch of Gallo-Romance languages is not shared by all linguists and philologists, particularly among Spanish ones, such as Ramón Menéndez Pidal.

Catalan bears varying degrees of similarity to the linguistic varieties subsumed under the cover term Occitan language (see also differences between Occitan and Catalan and Gallo-Romance languages). Thus, as it should be expected from closely related languages, Catalan today shares many traits with other Romance languages.

Relationship with other Romance languages

Some include Catalan in Occitan, as the linguistic distance between this language and some Occitan dialects (such as the Gascon language) is similar to the distance among different Occitan dialects. Catalan was considered a dialect of Occitan until the end of the 19th century and still today remains its closest relative.

Catalan shares many traits with the other neighboring Romance languages (Occitan, French, Italian, Sardinian as well as Spanish and Portuguese among others). However, despite being spoken mostly on the Iberian Peninsula, Catalan has marked differences with the Iberian Romance group (Spanish and Portuguese) in terms of pronunciation, grammar, and especially vocabulary; it shows instead its closest affinity with languages native to France and northern Italy, particularly Occitan and to a lesser extent Gallo-Romance (Franco-Provençal, French, Gallo-Italian).

According to Ethnologue, the lexical similarity between Catalan and other Romance languages is: 87% with Italian; 85% with Portuguese and Spanish; 76% with Ladin and Romansh; 75% with Sardinian; and 73% with Romanian.

During much of its history, and especially during the Francoist dictatorship (1939–1975), the Catalan language was ridiculed as a mere dialect of Spanish. This view, based on political and ideological considerations, has no linguistic validity. Spanish and Catalan have important differences in their sound systems, lexicon, and grammatical features, placing the language in features closer to Occitan (and French).

There is evidence that, at least from the 2nd century , the vocabulary and phonology of Roman Tarraconensis was different from the rest of Roman Hispania. Differentiation arose generally because Spanish, Asturian, and Galician-Portuguese share certain peripheral archaisms (Spanish , Asturian and Portuguese  vs. Catalan , Occitan  "to boil") and innovatory regionalisms (Sp , Ast  vs. Cat , Oc  "bullock"), while Catalan has a shared history with the Western Romance innovative core, especially Occitan.

Like all Romance languages, Catalan has a handful of native words which are unique to it, or rare elsewhere. These include:
 verbs:  'to fasten; transfix' >  'to compose, write up',  >  'to combine, conjugate',  >  'to wake; awaken',  'to thicken; crowd together' >  'to save, keep',  >  'to miss, yearn, pine for',  'to investigate, track' > Old Catalan enagar 'to incite, induce',  > OCat ujar 'to exhaust, fatigue',  >  'to appease, mollify',  >  'to reject, refuse';
 nouns:  >  'pomace',  >  'reedmace',  >  'catarrh',  >  'snowdrift',  >  'ardor, passion',  >  'brake',  >  'avalanche',  >  'edge, border',  'sawfish' > pestriu >  'thresher shark, smooth hound; ray',  'live coal' >  'spark',  > tardaó >  'autumn'.

The Gothic superstrate produced different outcomes in Spanish and Catalan.

The same happens with Arabic loanwords. However, the Arabic element in Spanish is generally much more prevalent.

Situated between two large linguistic blocks (Iberian Romance and Gallo-Romance), Catalan has many unique lexical choices, such as  "to miss somebody",  "to calm somebody down", and  "reject".

Geographic distribution

Catalan-speaking territories

Various interpretations of the term may include some or all of these regions.

Number of speakers
The number of people known to be fluent in Catalan varies depending on the sources used. A 2004 study did not count the total number of speakers, but estimated a total of 9–9.5 million by matching the percentage of speakers to the population of each area where Catalan is spoken. The web site of the Generalitat de Catalunya estimated that as of 2004 there were 9,118,882 speakers of Catalan. These figures only reflect potential speakers; today it is the native language of only 35.6% of the Catalan population. According to Ethnologue, Catalan had 4.1 million native speakers and 5.1 million second-language speakers in 2021.

According to a 2011 study the total number of Catalan speakers is over 9.8 million, with 5.9 million residing in Catalonia. More than half of them speak Catalan as a second language, with native speakers being about 4.4 million of those (more than 2.8 in Catalonia). Very few Catalan monoglots exist; basically, virtually all of the Catalan speakers in Spain are bilingual speakers of Catalan and Spanish, with a sizable population of Spanish-only speakers of immigrant origin (typically born outside Catalonia or whose parents were both born outside Catalonia)  existing in the major Catalan urban areas as well.

In Roussillon, only a minority of French Catalans speak Catalan nowadays, with French being the majority language for the inhabitants after a continued process of language shift. According to a 2019 survey by the Catalan government, 31.5% of the inhabitants of Catalonia have Catalan as first language at home whereas 52.7% have Spanish, 2.8% both Catalan and Spanish and 10.8% other languages.

Spanish is the most spoken language in Barcelona (according to the linguistic census held by the Government of Catalonia in 2013) and it is understood almost universally. According to this census of 2013 Catalan is also very commonly spoken in the city of 1,501,262: it is understood by 95% of the population, while 72.3% over the age of 2 can speak it (1,137,816), 79% can read it (1,246.555), and 53% can write it (835,080). The proportion in Barcelona who can speak it, 72.3%, is lower than that of the overall Catalan population, of whom 81.2% over the age of 15 speak the language. Knowledge of Catalan has increased significantly in recent decades thanks to a language immersion educational system. An important social characteristic of the Catalan language is that all the areas where it is spoken are bilingual in practice: together with the French language in Roussillon, with Italian in Alghero, with Spanish and French in Andorra and with Spanish in the rest of the territories.

1. The number of people who understand Catalan includes those who can speak it.
2. Figures relate to all self-declared capable speakers, not just native speakers.

Level of knowledge

(% of the population 15 years old and older).

Social use

(% of the population 15 years old and older).

Native language

Phonology

Catalan phonology varies by dialect. Notable features include:
 Abundance of diphthongs containing , as in Galician and Portuguese.

In contrast to other Romance languages, Catalan has many monosyllabic words, and these may end in a wide variety of consonants, including some consonant clusters.

Central Catalan pronunciation is considered to be standard for the language. The descriptions below are mostly representative of this variety. For the differences in pronunciation between the different dialects, see the section on pronunciation of dialects in this article.

Vowels

Catalan has inherited the typical vowel system of Vulgar Latin, with seven stressed phonemes: , a common feature in Western Romance, with the exception of Spanish. Balearic also has instances of stressed . Dialects differ in the different degrees of vowel reduction, and the incidence of the pair .

In Central Catalan, unstressed vowels reduce to three: ; ;  remains distinct. The other dialects have different vowel reduction processes (see the section pronunciation of dialects in this article).

Consonants

The consonant system of Catalan is rather conservative.
  has a velarized allophone in syllable coda position in most dialects. However,  is velarized irrespective of position in Eastern dialects like Majorcan and standard Eastern Catalan.
  occurs in Balearic, Algherese, standard Valencian and some areas in southern Catalonia. It has merged with  elsewhere.
 Voiced obstruents undergo final-obstruent devoicing: .
 Voiced stops become lenited to approximants in syllable onsets, after continuants:  > ,  > ,  > . Exceptions include  after lateral consonants, and  after . In coda position, these sounds are realized as stops, except in some Valencian dialects where they are lenited.
Some sources describe them as "postalveolar". Others as "back alveolo-palatal", implying that the characters  would be more accurate. However, in all literature only the characters for palato-alveolar affricates and fricatives are used, even when the same sources use  for other languages like Polish and Chinese.
 The distribution of the two rhotics  and  closely parallels that of Spanish. Between vowels, the two contrast, but they are otherwise in complementary distribution: in the onset of the first syllable in a word,  appears unless preceded by a consonant. Dialects vary in regards to rhotics in the coda with Western Catalan generally featuring  and Central Catalan dialects featuring a weakly trilled  unless it precedes a vowel-initial word in the same prosodic unit, in which case  appears.
 In careful speech,  may be geminated. Geminated  may also occur. Some analyze intervocalic  as the result of gemination of a single rhotic phoneme. This is similar to the common analysis of Spanish and Portuguese rhotics.

Phonological evolution

Sociolinguistics
Catalan sociolinguistics studies the situation of Catalan in the world and the different varieties that this language presents. It is a subdiscipline of Catalan philology and other affine studies and has as an objective to analyze the relation between the Catalan language, the speakers and the close reality (including the one of other languages in contact).

Preferential subjects of study
 Dialects of Catalan
 Variations of Catalan by class, gender, profession, age and level of studies
 Process of linguistic normalization
 Relations between Catalan and Spanish or French
 Perception on the language of Catalan speakers and non-speakers
 Presence of Catalan in several fields: tagging, public function, media, professional sectors

Dialects

Overview

The dialects of the Catalan language feature a relative uniformity, especially when compared to other Romance languages; both in terms of vocabulary, semantics, syntax, morphology, and phonology. Mutual intelligibility between dialects is very high, estimates ranging from 90% to 95%. The only exception is the isolated idiosyncratic Algherese dialect.

Catalan is split in two major dialectal blocks: Eastern and Western. There are a few other differences in pronunciation, verbal morphology, and vocabulary.

Western Catalan comprises the two dialects of Northwestern Catalan and Valencian; the Eastern block comprises four dialects: Central Catalan, Balearic, Rossellonese, and Algherese. Each dialect can be further subdivided in several subdialects. The terms "Catalan" and "Valencian" (respectively used in Catalonia and the Valencian Community) refer to two varieties of the same language. There are two institutions regulating the two standard varieties, the Institute of Catalan Studies in Catalonia and the Valencian Academy of the Language in the Valencian Community.

Central Catalan is considered the standard pronunciation of the language and has the largest number of speakers. It is spoken in the densely populated regions of the Barcelona province, the eastern half of the province of Tarragona, and most of the province of Girona.

Catalan has an inflectional grammar. Nouns have two genders (masculine, feminine), and two numbers (singular, plural). Pronouns additionally can have a neuter gender, and some are also inflected for case and politeness, and can be combined in very complex ways. Verbs are split in several paradigms and are inflected for person, number, tense, aspect, mood, and gender. In terms of pronunciation, Catalan has many words ending in a wide variety of consonants and some consonant clusters, in contrast with many other Romance languages.

Pronunciation

Vowels
Catalan has inherited the typical vowel system of Vulgar Latin, with seven stressed phonemes: , a common feature in Western Romance, except Spanish. Balearic has also instances of stressed . Dialects differ in the different degrees of vowel reduction, and the incidence of the pair .

In Eastern Catalan (except Majorcan), unstressed vowels reduce to three: ; ;  remains distinct. There are a few instances of unreduced ,  in some words.

In Western Catalan, unstressed vowels reduce to five: ; ;  remain distinct. This reduction pattern, inherited from Proto-Romance, is also found in Italian and Portuguese. Some Western dialects present further reduction or vowel harmony in some cases.

Consonants

Morphology

E.g.

Western Catalan: In verbs, the inchoative endings are /, /.

'men',  'youth'.

'men',  'youth' (Ibicencan, however, follows the model of Western Catalan in this case).

Vocabulary
Despite its relative lexical unity, the two dialectal blocks of Catalan (Eastern and Western) show some differences in word choices. Any lexical divergence within any of the two groups can be explained as an archaism. Also, usually Central Catalan acts as an innovative element.

Standards

Standard Catalan, virtually accepted by all speakers, is mostly based on Eastern Catalan, which is the most widely used dialect. Nevertheless, the standards of the Valencian Community and the Balearics admit alternative forms, mostly traditional ones, which are not current in eastern Catalonia.

The most notable difference between both standards is some tonic  accentuation, for instance:  (IEC) –  (AVL).

In the Balearic Islands, IEC's standard is used but adapted for the Balearic dialect by the University of the Balearic Islands's philological section. Another feature of the Balearic standard is the non-ending in the 1st person singular present indicative:  ('I buy'),  ('I fear'),  ('I sleep').

In Alghero, the IEC has adapted its standard to the Algherese dialect.

In 2011, the Aragonese government passed a decree approving the statutes of a new language regulator of Catalan in La Franja (the so-called Catalan-speaking areas of Aragon) as originally provided for by Law 10/2009.

Status of Valencian

Valencian is classified as a Western dialect, along with the northwestern varieties spoken in Western Catalonia (provinces of Lleida and the western half of Tarragona). Central Catalan has 90% to 95% inherent intelligibility for speakers of Valencian.

Linguists, including Valencian scholars, deal with Catalan and Valencian as the same language. The official regulating body of the language of the Valencian Community, the Valencian Academy of Language (Acadèmia Valenciana de la Llengua, AVL) declares the linguistic unity between Valencian and Catalan varieties.

The AVL, created by the Valencian parliament, is in charge of dictating the official rules governing the use of Valencian, and its standard is based on the Norms of Castelló (Normes de Castelló). Currently, everyone who writes in Valencian uses this standard, except the Royal Academy of Valencian Culture (Acadèmia de Cultura Valenciana, RACV), which uses for Valencian an independent standard.

Despite the position of the official organizations, an opinion poll carried out between 2001 and 2004 showed that the majority of the Valencian people consider Valencian different from Catalan. This position is promoted by people who do not use Valencian regularly. Furthermore, the data indicates that younger generations educated in Valencian are much less likely to hold these views. A minority of Valencian scholars active in fields other than linguistics defends the position of the Royal Academy of Valencian Culture (Acadèmia de Cultura Valenciana, RACV), which uses for Valencian a standard independent from Catalan.

This clash of opinions has sparked much controversy. For example, during the drafting of the European Constitution in 2004, the Spanish government supplied the EU with translations of the text into Basque, Galician, Catalan, and Valencian, but the latter two were identical.

Vocabulary

Word choices
Despite its relative lexical unity, the two dialectal blocks of Catalan (Eastern and Western) show some differences in word choices. Any lexical divergence within any of the two groups can be explained as an archaism. Also, usually Central Catalan acts as an innovative element.

Literary Catalan allows the use of words from different dialects, except those of very restricted use. However, from the 19th century onwards, there has been a tendency towards favoring words of Northern dialects to the detriment of others,

Latin and Greek loanwords
Like other languages, Catalan has a large list of loanwords from Greek and Latin. This process started very early, and one can find such examples in Ramon Llull's work. In the 14th and 15th centuries Catalan had a far greater number of Greco-Latin loanwords than other Romance languages, as is attested for example in Roís de Corella's writings. The incorporation of learned, or "bookish" words from its own ancestor language, Latin, into Catalan is arguably another form of lexical borrowing through the influence of written language and the liturgical language of the Church. Throughout the Middle Ages and into the early modern period, most literate Catalan speakers were also literate in Latin; and thus they easily adopted Latin words into their writing—and eventually speech—in Catalan.

Word formation
The process of morphological derivation in Catalan follows the same principles as the other Romance languages, where agglutination is common. Many times, several affixes are appended to a preexisting lexeme, and some sound alternations can occur, for example   ("electrical") vs.  .

There is greater regularity in the process of word-compounding, where one can find compounded words formed much like those in English.

Writing system

Catalan uses the Latin script, with some added symbols and digraphs. The Catalan orthography is systematic and largely phonologically based. Standardization of Catalan was among the topics discussed during the First International Congress of the Catalan Language, held in Barcelona October 1906. Subsequently, the Philological Section of the Institut d'Estudis Catalans (IEC, founded in 1911) published the Normes ortogràfiques in 1913 under the direction of Antoni Maria Alcover and Pompeu Fabra. In 1932, Valencian writers and intellectuals gathered in Castelló de la Plana to make a formal adoption of the so-called Normes de Castelló, a set of guidelines following Pompeu Fabra's Catalan language norms.

Grammar

The grammar of Catalan is similar to other Romance languages. Features include:
 Use of definite and indefinite articles.
 Nouns, adjectives, pronouns, and articles are inflected for gender (masculine and feminine), and number (singular and plural). There is no case inflexion, except in pronouns.
 Verbs are highly inflected for person, number, tense, aspect, and mood (including a subjunctive).
 There are no modal auxiliaries.
 Word order is freer than in English.

Gender and number inflection

In gender inflection, the most notable feature is (compared to Portuguese, Spanish or Italian), the loss of the typical masculine suffix . Thus, the alternance of /, has been replaced by ø/. There are only a few exceptions, like / ("scarce"). Many not completely predictable morphological alternations may occur, such as:
 Affrication: / ("insane") vs. / ("ugly")
 Loss of : / ("flat") vs. / ("second")
 Final obstruent devoicing: / ("felt") vs. / ("said")

Catalan has few suppletive couplets, like Italian and Spanish, and unlike French. Thus, Catalan has / ("boy"/"girl") and / ("cock"/"hen"), whereas French has / and /.

There is a tendency to abandon traditionally gender-invariable adjectives in favor of marked ones, something prevalent in Occitan and French. Thus, one can find / ("boiling") in contrast with traditional /.

As in the other Western Romance languages, the main plural expression is the suffix , which may create morphological alternations similar to the ones found in gender inflection, albeit more rarely. The most important one is the addition of  before certain consonant groups, a phonetic phenomenon that does not affect feminine forms: / ("the pulse"/"the pulses") vs. / ("the dust"/"the dusts").

Determiners

The inflection of determinatives is complex, specially because of the high number of elisions, but is similar to the neighboring languages.

Central Catalan has abandoned almost completely unstressed possessives (etc.) in favor of constructions of article + stressed forms (etc.), a feature shared with Italian.

Personal pronouns

The morphology of Catalan personal pronouns is complex, especially in unstressed forms, which are numerous (13 distinct forms, compared to 11 in Spanish or 9 in Italian). Features include the gender-neutral  and the great degree of freedom when combining different unstressed pronouns (65 combinations).

Catalan pronouns exhibit T–V distinction, like all other Romance languages (and most European languages, but not Modern English). This feature implies the use of a different set of second person pronouns for formality.

This flexibility allows Catalan to use extraposition extensively, much more than French or Spanish. Thus, Catalan can have  ("they recommended me to him"), whereas in French one must say , and Spanish . This allows the placement of almost any nominal term as a sentence topic, without having to use so often the passive voice (as in French or English), or identifying the direct object with a preposition (as in Spanish).

Verbs

Like all the Romance languages, Catalan verbal inflection is more complex than the nominal. Suffixation is omnipresent, whereas morphological alternations play a secondary role. Vowel alternances are active, as well as infixation and suppletion. However, these are not as productive as in Spanish, and are mostly restricted to irregular verbs.

However, this division is mostly theoretical. The verbs of the second conjugation are fewer than 100, and it is not possible to create new ones, except by compounding.

Syntax

The grammar of Catalan follows the general pattern of Western Romance languages. The primary word order is subject–verb–object. However, word order is very flexible. Commonly, verb-subject constructions are used to achieve a semantic effect. Both sentences mean "the train has arrived", but the former puts a focus on the train, while the latter puts a focus on the arrival. This subtle distinction is described as "what you might say while waiting in the station" versus "what you might say on the train."

Catalan names

In Spain, every person officially has two surnames, one of which is the father's first surname and the other is the mother's first surname. The law contemplates the possibility of joining both surnames with the Catalan conjunction i ("and").

Sample text
Selected text from Manuel de Pedrolo's 1970 novel  ("A love affair outside the city").

See also

Organizations
 Institut d'Estudis Catalans (Catalan Studies Institute)
 Acadèmia Valenciana de la Llengua (Valencian Academy of the Language)
 Òmnium Cultural
 Plataforma per la Llengua
Scholars
 Marina Abràmova
 Germà Colón
 Dominique de Courcelles
 Martí de Riquer
 Arthur Terry
 Lawrence Venuti
Other
 Languages of Catalonia
 Linguistic features of Spanish as spoken by Catalan speakers
 Languages of France
 Languages of Italy
 Languages of Spain
 Normes de Castelló
 Pompeu Fabra

Notes

References

Works cited

External links

Institutions
 Consorci per a la Normalització Lingüística
 Institut d'Estudis Catalans
 Acadèmia Valenciana de la Llengua

About the Catalan language
 llengua.gencat.cat, by the Government of Catalonia
 Gramàtica de la Llengua Catalana (Catalan grammar), from the Institute for Catalan Studies
 Gramàtica Normativa Valenciana (2006, Valencian grammar), from the Acadèmia Valenciana de la Llengua
 verbs.cat (Catalan verb conjugations with online trainers)
 Catalan and its dialects
 LEXDIALGRAM – online portal of 19th-century dialectal lexicographical and grammatical works of Catalan hosted by the University of Barcelona

Monolingual dictionaries
 DIEC2, from the Institut d'Estudis Catalans
 Gran Diccionari de la Llengua Catalana , from Enciclopèdia Catalana
 Diccionari Català-Valencià-Balear d'Alcover i Moll , from the Institut d'Estudis Catalans
 Diccionari Normatiu Valencià (AVL), from the Acadèmia Valenciana de la Llengua
 diccionarivalencia.com (online Valencian dictionary)
 Diccionari Invers de la Llengua Catalana (dictionary of Catalan words spelled backwards)

Bilingual and multilingual dictionaries
 Diccionari de la Llengua Catalana Multilingüe (Catalan ↔ English, French, German and Spanish), from Enciclopèdia Catalana 
 DACCO – open source, collaborative dictionary (Catalan–English)

Automated translation systems
 Traductor automated, online translations of text and web pages (Catalan ↔ English, French and Spanish), from gencat.cat by the Government of Catalonia

Phrasebooks
 Catalan phrasebook on Wikivoyage

Learning resources
 Catalan Swadesh list of basic vocabulary words, from Wiktionary's Swadesh-list appendix

Catalan-language online encyclopedia
 Enciclopèdia Catalana

 
Subject–verb–object languages
Stress-timed languages